George Munro (November 12, 1825 – April 23, 1896) was a Canadian educator and philanthropist from Nova Scotia.

Biography 
George Munro was born in West River, Pictou County, Nova Scotia. After basic schooling he became an apprentice at the age of 12 with a local newspaper known as The Observer. After two years he continued his education attending the New Glasgow School from 1839 to 1842. After this he taught for a year to raise enough money to attend Pictou Academy.

Around 1850, Munro moved to Halifax and taught natural philosophy and mathematics at the Free Church Academy. He eventually became the school's principal before leaving for New York City in 1856. Five years later in 1861, he joined the publishing firm Irwin P. Beadle and Company. In 1863 the firm broke up and Munro entered in a partnership with Beadle and ended up owning the company a year later.

Munro became affluent from his publishing company and in 1879 began donating to Dalhousie University under the influence of his brother-in-law, a member of the university's Board of Governors. At the time Dalhousie's total income was only $6,600, and the university was in danger of shutting down. Munro donated the institution a total of $333,000 (about $8 million in today's money), which included endowed professorships and bursaries.

He died in Pine Hill, New York on April 23, 1896.

To commemorate his generosity, a university holiday, Munro Day, is celebrated each year on the first Friday of February.

References

External links 
Biography at the Dictionary of Canadian Biography Online

1825 births
1896 deaths
19th-century Canadian educators
Dalhousie University
Pre-Confederation Canadian businesspeople
People from Pictou County
Colony of Nova Scotia people
Canadian people of Scottish descent
19th-century Canadian philanthropists